Nelson Mandela Metropolitan University F.C. is as an association football club representing the Nelson Mandela Metropolitan University in Port Elizabeth, South Africa. The club was brought to its current form in 2005, through mergers of three football clubs. NMMU's previous institutions had football clubs at the University of Port Elizabeth, Port Elizabeth Technikon and Vista University's Port Elizabeth.

The school of excellence was founded in 2000 at UPE for FC Copenhagen. In 2003–04 the club won the Eastern Cape provincial league. PE Tech had previously run a professional club, which played in the National First Division in 2000–01 season. In 2006, the UPE franchise was sold to Bay United and became known as Bay Academy.

In 2011, the men's team won the University Sport South Africa championship, with a 3–0 win over Cape Peninsula University of Technology at the University of Limpopo.

During the 2013 season, the club has 3 senior men's teams and 1 senior women's team. The men's teams play in the Port Elizabeth Football Association's (PEFA) premier league, premier reserve league, and 2nd division. The women's team plays in the PEFA women's league.

Honours
2000–01 Vodacom League, Eastern Cape: 1st (as Port Elizabeth Technikon)
2000–01 Vodacom League Coastal Stream: Promoted to the National First Division (as Port Elizabeth Technikon)
2002–03 Vodacom League, Eastern cape: 1st (as University of Port Elizabeth)
2010 University Sport South Africa Eastern Cape: 1st
2011 University Sports South Africa men's football tournament: 1st

Results
Season finishing places for the premier men's team
2001–02 National First Division Coastal Stream: 9th (as Port Elizabeth Technikon)
2002–03 National First Division Coastal Stream: 14th(relegated) (as Port Elizabeth Technikon)
2005–06 Vodacom League Eastern Cape: 9th
2005–06 Vodacom League Eastern Cape: 14th (as Port Elizabeth Technikon)
2006–07 Vodacom League Eastern Cape: unknown
2007–08 Vodacom League Eastern Cape: unknown
2008–09 Vodacom League Eastern Cape: 14th
2009 Port Elizabeth Football Association Premier Division: 6th
2009 Port Elizabeth Football Association Premier Division: 2nd (as NMMU Missionvale)
2010 Port Elizabeth Football Association Premier Division: 2nd
2010 Port Elizabeth Football Association Premier Division: 3rd (as NMMU Missionvale)
2010 University Sport South Africa Eastern Cape: 1st 
2010 University Sport South Africa National Tournament: 10th 
2011 Port Elizabeth Football Association Premier Division: 2nd
2011 Port Elizabeth Football Association Premier Division: 6th (as NMMU Missionvale)
2011 University Sport South Africa National Tournament: 1st 
2012 Port Elizabeth Football Association Premier Division: 5th
2012 University Sport South Africa National Tournament: 12th 
2013 Varsity Football: 2nd
2013 Port Elizabeth Football Association Premier Division: 3rd
2013 University Sport South Africa National Tournament: 5th
2014 Varsity Football: 5th
2014 Port Elizabeth Football Association Premier Division: 1st
2014 University Sport South Africa National Tournament: 5th

Club officials
Chairman: Kagiso Tsiane
Vice-chairman: Nomzamo Maheneza
Secretary: Nasreen Astrie
Treasurer: Siseko Mazwi

Technical team
Manager: Mark Tommy
Men's coach: Lukhanya Wasa
Women's coach: Douleen Whitebooi

First team squad
As of 20 July 2015, Varsity Football squad

Notable players
The following former NMMU players have represented South Africa:

Kermit Erasmus
Elrio van Heerden
Siboniso Gaxa
Lee Langeveldt

In addition the following former NMMU players have played professional football:

Niven Kops
Siyabulela Songwiqi

Former coaches
 Roald Poulsen (2000–2004)

Previous names
 2000 University of Port Elizabeth (UPE-FCK)
 2004 Nelson Mandela Metropolitan University (NMMU-FCK)

Sponsors
Shirt sponsor: ABSA
Kit manufacturer: PUMA
Previous club sponsor: PUMA

References

Association football clubs established in 2000
University and college soccer clubs in South Africa
Soccer clubs in the Eastern Cape
Soccer clubs in Port Elizabeth
Nelson Mandela University
2000 establishments in South Africa